Carl Karilivacz  (November 20, 1930 – August 30, 1969) was an American football defensive back who played eight seasons in the National Football League with the Detroit Lions, the New York Giants, and the Los Angeles Rams. He played college football at Syracuse.

NFL career

Detroit Lions 
Karilivacz was drafted in the 23rd round of the 1953 NFL Draft by the Detroit Lions to play wide receiver. He was switched to defense during training camp.

Over five seasons with the Lions, he played in 58 games with 52 starts, including three championship games in 1953, 1954, and 1957. While the 1954 championship game ended in a loss, the other two resulted in the Lions, and Karilivacz, being crowned NFL champions.

New York Giants 
Tom Landry, the player-coach of the New York Giants, had been looking for a player to play right cornerback and made a trade for Karilivacz on September 15, 1958, exchanging him for a 1959 fourth-round pick. The Lions later used this pick to select Bob Grottkau 46th overall.

Karilivacz played twelve games in his singular season with the Giants, scoring one touchdown on a 23-yard fumble return.

Los Angeles Rams 
After the Giants acquired cornerback Dick Lynch, Karilivacz signed with the Los Angeles Rams. Over two seasons with the Rams, he played in 15 games with 7 starts.

Pittsburgh Steelers 
Karilivacz spent a brief amount of time in the 1961 offseason with the Pittsburgh Steelers. He was released by the Steelers on September 12.

Death 
Karilivacz died at his home of a heart attack on August 30, 1969.

References

External links 

 Carl C. Karilivacz at Find a Grave

1930 births
1969 deaths
American football defensive backs
Syracuse Orange football players
Detroit Lions players
New York Giants players
Los Angeles Rams players
Pittsburgh Steelers players
Sportspeople from Glen Cove, New York
Players of American football from New York (state)
Glen Cove High School alumni